Harry Kaiser is an economist and the Gellert Family Professor of Applied Economics and Management at Cornell University. He is the father of three children, and currently teaches at Cornell University.

Areas of research
Kaiser has expertise in price analysis, marketing, industrial organization, policy, agricultural policy analysis and quantitative methods. Kaiser was one of the first economists to investigate the economic impacts of climate change on agriculture. He is the director of the Cornell Commodity Promotion Research Program.  Additionally, Kaiser conducts the economic analysis required by the U.S. Congress for the national dairy and fluid milk processor advertising programs.  He has served as the editor of Agriculture and Resource Economics Review, and as the president of the Northeastern Agricultural and Resource Economics Association.  Kaiser has also served on the executive board of directors of the American Agricultural Economics Association.

Awards and honors
University of Minnesota Outstanding Achievement Award, 2009
Department of Applied Economics, University of Minnesota Outstanding Alumni Award, 2009
Co-recipient of the Outstanding Journal Article, Canadian Agricultural Economics Society, 2009
University of Wisconsin Alumni Distinguished Achievement Award, 2006
Distinguished Member Award, Northeastern Association of Agricultural and Resource Economics, 2009
Distinguished Member Award, Northeastern Association of Agricultural and Resource Economics, 2003
Annual Jerome Johnson Lecture, University of Wisconsin-Eau Claire, 2000
Co-recipient of the Outstanding Journal Article, Northeastern Association of Agricultural and Resource Economics, 1991
Co-recipient of the American Association of Agricultural Economics Group Extension Award, 1986

Education
Ph.D., University of Minnesota, 1985
M.S., University of Minnesota, 1981
B.A., University of Wisconsin-Eau Claire, 1979

References

External links

http://aem.cornell.edu/profiles/kaiser.htm
http://commodity.aem.cornell.edu/staff/Harry/harry.htm
http://www1.umn.edu/news/news-releases/2009/UR_CONTENT_139898.html

https://web.archive.org/web/20100306220609/http://www.ers.usda.gov/Briefing/CPIFoodAndExpenditures/ScannerBios.htm

University of Wisconsin–Eau Claire alumni
University of Minnesota alumni
Living people
American economists
Cornell University faculty
Year of birth missing (living people)